RossoNoemi is the second studio album by Italian singer Noemi, published on 22 March 2011 by Sony Music Italy.

The album, with a prominent rock-oriented sound, was preceded by the single "Vuoto a perdere", published on 28 January 2011 and written by the Italian rock-star Vasco Rossi, with Gaetano Curreri, the leader of the band Stadio. The first single was produced by Celso Valli, while the remaining songs were produced by Corrado Rustici.  RossoNoemi was recorded & mixed by engineer Chris Manning.

The second single, "Odio tutti i cantanti", was released on 6 May 2011, while "Poi inventi il modo" was released on 16 September 2011 as the third single from the album.

Following Noemi's participation in the 62nd Sanremo Music Festival, on 15 February 2012 the album was re-released in a new version, including the single "Sono solo parole", which came third in the competition.

The album was certified platinum by the Federation of the Italian Music Industry, for domestic sales exceeding 60,000 units.

Track listing

Standard Edition

2012 Edition

Charts

References

2011 albums
Noemi (singer) albums
Sony Music Italy albums
Italian-language albums